The Badminton men's team event at the 1998 Asian Games was scheduled from 8–11 December 1998 at Thamassat University Sports Complex, Bangkok, Thailand.

Defending champion, Indonesia successfully retained their gold medal after defeating China 4 - 0 in the final. It was in this event, the Indonesian team had introduced their future star, The Enigma Taufik Hidayat for the first time. Being just at 17, Hidayat clinched the winning point in the 2nd singles match to earn Indonesia the gold medal. Below are the summaries and results for the Semifinals and Final matches of the event.

Schedule
All times are Indochina Time (UTC+07:00)

Results

1st round

Quarterfinals

Semifinals

Final

References

External links
https://web.archive.org/web/20110820173312/http://www2.sbg.ac.at/populorum/badminton/asia.htm

Men's team